Shangla District is a district in Malakand Division of Khyber Pakhtunkhwa, Pakistan. The district's headquarter is located at Alpuri, while the largest city and commercial center is Besham. The district was established in 1995, having previously been a subdivision of Swat District. The total area of the district is 1,586 square kilometers.
Shangla comprises three subdivisions, Alpuri, Puran and Besham tehsils.

Location
The district is bounded in the north by Kohistan District, in the east by Battagram District and Torghar District, in the west by Swat District, and in the south by Buner District.

History
There are relics of the ancient Greek period at Pirsar, Chakesar and Daut. it is believed that Alexander the Great camped at Pirsar for a few days. There are also relics of the Hindu Shahi in Olandar-Ajmair. 
A number of Buddha sculptures also are also found in district Shangla which indicate that Shangla was also the previous part of Buddhist civilization.

Geography 

Shangla district consists of small valleys and is situated between the hillocks and surrounded by high mountains full of forests comprising Pindrow Fir, Morinda Spruce, Blue Pine (Kail), Chir Pine and Deodar Cedar trees. The average elevation of the district is 2000 to 3000 meters above sea level. The highest point (3,440 m) is near Kuz Ganrshal in the north of the district.

Demographics
At the time of the 2017 census the district had a population of 759,609, of which 386,082 were males and 373,508 females. The entire population was rural. The literacy rate was 33.13% - the male literacy rate was 51.67% while the female literacy rate was 14.50%. 230 people in the district were from religious minorities. Pashto was the predominant language, spoken by 96.76% of the population. 

The district was hit by the 2015 Hindu Kush earthquake in which more than 18 people killed.

The main tribe of Shangla is Yusufzai that contribute more than half of the district population, the dense and well populated area of Shangla is Alpuri tehsil(gwarband) that contribute more than 253000+ of district population, Shangla is one of the unique districts of Pakistan that contains more than 80% of forest land. The youngest noble laurate Malala Yousafzai's father, Ziauddin Yousafzai, was born in Shangla, however, she herself was born in Mingora, Swat.

Education 
In November 2022, the Chief Minister of Khyber Pakhtunkhwa, Mahmood Khan, inaugurated University of Shangla. The university was earlier a campus of University of Swat.

National and provincial assembly
This district is represented by one elected MNA (Member of National Assembly) in Pakistan National Assembly. Its constituency is NA-31.

Since 2002: NA-10 (Shangla)

Provincial Assembly

References

Bibliography  

 
Districts of Khyber Pakhtunkhwa
History of Pakistan